Nishad Kumar (born 3 October 1999) is an Indian paralympian and high jumper. He made his maiden Paralympic Games appearance in 2020 Tokyo representing India and went onto claim silver medal in the men's high jump T47 category with a new Asian record of 2.06m.

Biography 
Nishad is from Una, Himachal Pradesh. In an accident at the age of eight, he lost his right hand.

He pursued his higher education at the Himachal Pradesh University. He is studying for a PE at Lovely Professional University.

In early 2021, he tested positive for COVID-19.

Career 
He took up the sport of para-athletics in 2009. In November 2019, he won the bronze medal in the men's T47 category at the 2019 World Para Athletics Championships and, as a result, he qualified to compete at the 2020 Summer Paralympics. He won the gold medal in T46 category at the 2021 World Para Athletics Grand Prix which was held in Dubai.

He also became the second Indian to win a medal at the 2020 Summer Paralympics after Bhavina Patel when he clinched a silver in the T47 category high jump event along with an Asian Record. He incredibly shared the silver medal with Dallas Wise of USA who also cleared the same distance of 2.06m.

References 

1999 births
Living people
Indian male high jumpers
Paralympic athletes of India
Paralympic silver medalists for India
Paralympic medalists in athletics (track and field)
Medalists at the 2020 Summer Paralympics
Athletes (track and field) at the 2020 Summer Paralympics
People from Himachal Pradesh
Recipients of the Arjuna Award